Gregory Rousseau (born April 5, 2000) is an American football defensive end for the Buffalo Bills of the National Football League (NFL). He played college football at Miami. As a redshirt freshman there in 2019, he recorded 15.5 sacks and won all-conference honors and was named ACC Defensive Rookie of the Year. Rousseau was drafted by the Bills in the first round of the 2021 NFL Draft.

Early life and college
Rousseau attended Champagnat Catholic School in Hialeah, Florida. He played defensive end, safety and wide receiver in high school. He committed to the University of Miami to play college football.

Rousseau played in the first two games of his true freshman year in 2018 before suffering a season-ending ankle injury and redshirted. He entered his redshirt freshman year in 2019 as a backup but eventually took over as starter later in the season. He was named ACC Defensive Rookie of the Year after recording 15.5 sacks that season, second in the nation behind only Chase Young's 16.5. He opted out of the 2020 season due to concerns regarding the COVID-19 pandemic.

Professional career

Rousseau was drafted by the Buffalo Bills in the first round (30th overall) in the 2021 NFL Draft. He signed his four-year rookie contract, worth $11.37 million, on June 4, 2021.

During Week 2 of the 2021 season, Rousseau was nominated for NFL Rookie of the Week honors with five tackles, two sacks, and two tackles made behind the line of scrimmage. Rousseau recorded his first career interception on October 10, 2021, in a 38-20 Week 5 Sunday night win against Patrick Mahomes and the Kansas City Chiefs, earning AFC Defensive Player of the Week. In his rookie season, Rousseau finished with four sacks, 50 total tackles, one interception, four passes defended, and one forced fumble. In the 2022 season, he finished with eight sacks, 37 total tackles, four passes defended, and forced fumble in 13 games.

NFL career statistics

Regular season

Postseason

References

External links

Buffalo Bills bio
Miami Hurricanes bio

2000 births
Living people
People from Coconut Creek, Florida
Players of American football from Florida
Sportspeople from Broward County, Florida
American football defensive ends
Miami Hurricanes football players
Buffalo Bills players